(NEOWISE) is a hyperbolic comet discovered 21 October 2016 by NEOWISE, the asteroid-and-comet-hunting portion of the Wide-Field Infrared Survey Explorer (WISE) mission. The comet brightened to magnitude +6.8 and could be observed with binoculars, during the first week of 2017 and it was closest to the Sun on 14 January 2017.

The aphelion of the comet lies at the inner edge of the Oort cloud and it is possible that the 2017 perihelion wasn't the first and that during a previous perihelion planetary perturbations pushed the comet towards the Oort cloud. Despite its small size, the comet survived perihelion and was observed for days from the SWAN instrument on board SOHO.

References

External links 
 
   

Non-periodic comets
C 2016 U1 (NEOWISE)
20161021